Trapezites sciron, the Sciron skipper, is a butterfly of the family Hesperiidae. It is found in the Australian states of Western Australia, South Australia and Victoria.

The wingspan is about 30 mm.

The larvae feed on Acanthocarpus canaliculatus, Acanthocarpus preissii, Lomandra caespitosa and Lomandra collina.

Subspecies
Trapezites sciron eremicola (Victoria and South Australia)
Trapezites sciron sciron (Western Australia)
Trapezites sciron atkinsi (south-west most tip of Western Australia)

References

External links
 Australian Caterpillars

Trapezitinae
Butterflies described in 1914
Butterflies of Australia